In computing, server application programming interface (SAPI) is the direct module interface to web servers such as the Apache HTTP Server, Microsoft IIS, and Oracle iPlanet Web Server. 
In other words, SAPI is an application programming interface (API) provided by the web server to help other developers in extending the web server capabilities.

Microsoft uses the term Internet Server Application Programming Interface (ISAPI), and the defunct Netscape web server used the term Netscape Server Application Programming Interface (NSAPI) for the same purpose.

As an example, PHP has a direct module interface called SAPI for different web servers; in the case of PHP 5 and Apache 2.0 on Windows, it is provided in the form of a DLL file called , which is a module that, among other functions, provides an interface between PHP and the web server, implemented in a form that the server understands.  This form is what is known as a SAPI.

Different kinds of SAPIs exist for various web-server extensions.  For example, in addition to those listed above, other SAPIs for the PHP language include the Common Gateway Interface (CGI) and command-line interface (CLI).

See also 

 FastCGI (a variation of the CGI)

References

External links 
 Developing modules for the Apache HTTP Server 2.4

Application programming interfaces